Paul Barnes (born 1961) is an American pianist. He concentrates particularly on the work of Liszt; Barnes also has worked extensively with Philip Glass, whose Piano Concerto No. 2 he premiered in 2004 at the Lied Center for Performing Arts. Barnes teaches at University of Nebraska-Lincoln school of music. He also teaches summer courses at the Vienna International Piano Academy.

References

http://www.paulbarnes.net/bio

University of Nebraska–Lincoln faculty
Living people
1961 births
20th-century American pianists
American male pianists
21st-century American pianists
20th-century American male musicians
21st-century American male musicians